Idalus bicolorella is a moth of the family Erebidae. It was described by Embrik Strand in 1919. It is found in Venezuela.

References

bicolorella
Moths described in 1919